Rajkot West is one of the 182 Legislative Assembly constituencies of Gujarat state in India. It is part of Rajkot district and it came into existence after 2008 delimitation. Prior to that some areas under it were called 'Rajkot II' seat. Its current MLA was Gujarat's Chief Minister Vijay Rupani. It is a segment of Rajkot Lok Sabha constituency.

List of segments
This assembly seat represents the following segments

 Rajkot Taluka (Part) – Rajkot Municipal Corporation (Part) Ward No. – 11, 12, 13, 14, 15, 22, 23, 24.

Members of Vidhan Sabha

Election results

2022

2017

2014 Bypoll

2012

2007
 Vajubhai Vala	M	BJP	48215	
 Nathwani Kashmira Bakulbhai	F	INC	38359

February 2002 by-poll

1998 Vidhan Sabha
 Vajubhai Roodabhai Vala (BJP) : 43,034 votes 
 Kashmeeraben Bakulbhai Nathvanee	F	AIRJP : 	14316

1990 Vidhan Sabha
 Vajubhai Vala (BJP) : 31,864 votes
 Sudhir Joshi	M	INC :	16388

See also
 List of constituencies of the Gujarat Legislative Assembly
 Rajkot district

References

External links
 

Assembly constituencies of Gujarat
Rajkot
2008 establishments in Gujarat
Constituencies established in 2008